Minnesota State University Moorhead (MSUM) is a public university in Moorhead, Minnesota. The school has an enrollment of 7,534 students in 2019 and 266 full-time faculty members. MSUM is a part of the Minnesota State Colleges and Universities system. MSUM is located on the western border of Minnesota on the Red River of the North in Moorhead; across the river lies Fargo, North Dakota.

History
The plans for what would become MSUM were laid down in 1885, when the Minnesota State Legislature passed a bill declaring the need for a new state normal school in the Red River Valley, with an eye on Moorhead. The State Senator who proposed the bill, State Senator Solomon Comstock, donated  and appropriated the funds that would go to form Moorhead Normal School, which opened in 1888. In 1921, the State authorized the school to offer the four-year Bachelor of Science degree in Education in order to satisfy the need for high school teachers in northwest Minnesota, and the school became Moorhead State Teachers College.

With the entrance of World War II, the college entered into a contract with the Army Air Corps to train aviation students.  After World War II, enrollment swelled to more than 700 students and the school diversified and broadened into both a liberal arts and professional curriculum. The school began offering a Bachelor of Arts degree in 1946 and graduate programs by 1953. As a result of the broadened offerings, by 1957 the name was changed to Moorhead State College.  In 1969, the school joined a cooperative cross-registration exchange with neighboring Concordia College and North Dakota State University, creating the Tri-College University. The school continued to increase its number of programs and by 1975, the State Legislature that year granted the school university status under the name Moorhead State University. In 1995, Moorhead State became part of the Minnesota State Colleges and Universities system. On July 1, 2000, the school was renamed Minnesota State University Moorhead via a request sent to the board of trustees of the system.

Minnesota State University Moorhead was rated the 18th top liberal arts college in the midwest by TIME magazine in 2008.

The school has gone through many names changes with Moorhead Normal School (1887), Moorhead State Teachers College (1921), Moorhead State College (1957), Moorhead State University (1975) and finally Minnesota State University Moorhead (2000).

Presidents

 1888–1899 Livingston C. Lord
 1899–1919 Frank A. Weld
 1919–1923 Oliver Dickerson
 1923–1941 Ray MacLean
 1941–1955 Otto W. Snarr
 1955–1958 A.L. Knoblauch
 1958–1968 John Neumaier
 1968–1994 Roland Dille
 1994–2008 Roland Barden
 2008–2014 Edna Mora Szymanski
 2014–present Anne E. Blackhurst

Academics

MSUM offers 76 undergraduate majors with 99 emphases and 14 graduate degree programs. MSUM's colleges: the College of Arts, Media and Communication; the College of Business and Innovation; the College of Education and Human Services; the College of Humanities and Social Sciences; and the College of Science, Health and the Environment.

MSUM is accredited by 14 national accrediting and certification agencies, including the Higher Learning Commission. The MSUM School of Business is fully accredited by the Association to Advance Collegiate Schools of Business International (AACSB).

The Nursing program is accredited at both the baccalaureate (BSN) and master’s (MS in nursing) levels by the Commission on Collegiate Nursing Education (CCNE). Additional areas of accreditation include: Speech, Language and Hearing Sciences; Athletic Training; and Teacher Education.

MSUM also collaborates with Concordia College, North Dakota State University, North Dakota State College of Science, and Minnesota State Community and Technical College on a Tri-College University program that offers students the chance to take courses between the five campuses that can be credited toward their degree.

Minnesota State University Moorhead professors have been recognized with more CASE Carnegie Foundation for the Advancement of Teaching Professors of the Year designations than any college or university, public or private, in Minnesota, the Dakotas, Iowa, or Wisconsin. One professor has earned CASE Carnegie United States Professor of the Year designation and eleven professors have earned designation as CASE Carnegie Minnesota Professor of the Year.

Publications
MSUM operates the New Rivers Press, a nonprofit literary press founded in 1968.

The campus newspaper is The Advocate, formerlyThe MiSTiC. The MiSTiC was closed by university administration in 1970.

The school also publishes a literary magazine, Red Weather, with the support of the English Department. The yearly publication is a journal of prose, poetry, interviews, photography and art by current undergraduates and graduate students, faculty, staff, and alumni.

Students produce a weekly open-submission literary journal entitled The Yellow Bicycle, a collection of poetry, prose, essays, and reviews.

MSUM produces a daily faculty/staff email newsletter called Dragon Digest and a twice a year publication for its alumni and friends titled Moorhead Magazine.

Dragon Radio
The school's college radio station is KMSC, an unlicensed station which airs on AM 1500. KMSC is a student organization that has been set up to run as a Non-profit Educational radio station and serves as an in-house learning facility.

Notable events
MSUM sponsors a Student Academic Conference annually. The Student Academic Conference provides student researchers from each of its colleges with the opportunity to present their work to faculty, administration, peers, and the general public in a formal academic setting. The conference was first offered in 1998.

The conference provides a formal setting for upper class students to present their research from classes required under their major. There is a possibility of the student's research being published or presented at a state, regional, or national conference. The Student Academic Conference is a great opportunity for students and MSUM to gain recognition on a larger scale. Any major or discipline can present at the conference as long as it abides by conference rules based on which forum the student chooses to present the research. There is an option to orally present using visual aids, Powerpoint, etc..., or the student can construct a poster board displaying key points and results to be presented in a more informal manner taking questions and inquiries from onlookers. The conference is kicked off by a luncheon for all the participants. For some majors, presenting at the conference is mandatory in which the student presents their discipline's research from their senior seminar or thesis class.

Athletics

Minnesota State University Moorhead teams participate as a member of the National Collegiate Athletic Association's NCAA Division II. The Dragons are a member of the Northern Sun Intercollegiate Conference (NSIC). 
The MSUM athletic teams are called the Dragons. MSUM has a wide variety of intramural sports including flag football, softball, and soccer. Club teams are also available for men's and women's rugby, men's and women's lacrosse, and baseball which compete nationally.

Men's sports include Basketball, Cross country, football, Track & field, and wrestling. Women's sports offered are Dance, Basketball, cross country, Golf, Soccer, Softball, Swimming & diving, Tennis, Track & field, and Volleyball

Study abroad programs

MSUM maintains a large number of study abroad programs throughout the world.  Programs organic to MSUM include the following:

Asia
 Nankai University in Tianjin China
 Kanda University of International Studies in Chiba Japan
 Kanto Gakuin in Yokohama Japan
 Nagoya Gakuin University in Nagoya, Aichi Japan
 Ritsumeikan Asia Pacific University in Beppu Japan
 Chung-Ang University in Seoul, South Korea
 Ming Chuan University in Taiwan

Australia
 University of the Sunshine Coast in Queensland Australia

Europe
 University of Portsmouth on England's southern coast
 Keele University located between Liverpool and Birmingham, in England
 Lincoln University located in central England
 Centre for Medieval and Renaissance Studies in Oxford, England
 Hedmark University College in southeast Norway

Notable alumni

 Barkhad Abdi, Actor, film director and producer
 Neal Tapio, Trump presidential campaign director and South Dakota state senator.
 Bob Bowlsby, Big 12 Commissioner
 Todd Brandt, Co-host of The Todd and Tyler Radio Empire
 Leif Enger, American author
 David Joerger, Head Coach of the Sacramento Kings
 Nikita Koloff (Nelson Scott Simpson), Professional wrestler
 Gary Love, Chief Risk Officer, United Nations
 Jan Maxwell, American actress
 Douglas Medin, Research psychologist
 Larry Munson, Radio announcer for the University of Georgia Bulldogs football for forty-two years
 Collin Peterson, Congressman of Minnesota's 7th district
 Tim Purdon, 18th U.S. Attorney for the District of North Dakota
 Adam Quesnell, stand-up comedian
 Ed Schultz, American television and radio personality
 Kevin Sorbo, (attended but did not graduate) American actor
 Neal Tapio, American businessman and Trump presidential campaign director. 
 Marc Trestman, Head Coach of the Toronto Argonauts
 Chris Tuchscherer – Wrestler; current mixed martial artist, formerly competing in the UFC
 Jonathan Twingley, American artist, illustrator, and author
 Jerry verDorn, American actor
 Patrick Volkerding, Founder of Slackware Linux distribution

Notable faculty
 Roland Dille (1924–2014), Professor of English, Dean of Academic Affairs, then President for 26 years
 David Mason (b. 1954), Poet & writer
 Thomas McGrath (1916–1990), Poet, Rhodes scholar, and Professor of English
 James Wright (1927–1980), Poet
 Mark Mostert (1992–2000) Program Coordinator for Programs and Licensure in Learning Disabilities. Professor, of Special Education at Regent University author and lecturer on Eugenics, Facilitated Communication and "useless eaters".

See also

 List of colleges and universities in Minnesota
 Higher education in Minnesota

References

Notes

External links
 
 MSUM Athletics website

 
Public universities and colleges in Minnesota
Education in Fargo–Moorhead
Educational institutions established in 1887
Education in Clay County, Minnesota
Buildings and structures in Clay County, Minnesota
Tourist attractions in Clay County, Minnesota
Moorhead, Minnesota
1887 establishments in Minnesota